Polenitsa is a village in South West Bulgaria in Blagoevgrad Province, 159 km from the capital city of Sofia and 2 km from the spa resort of Sandanski. The village has a permanent population of 1150 people (2008).

References
Polenitsa at ESRI map

Villages in Blagoevgrad Province